Lucy Thompson (Yurok: Che-na-wah Weitch-ah-wah; 1856-1932) was a Native American author known for her book To the American Indian: Reminiscences of a Yurok Woman. Written in 1916, the book is intended to preserve her people's stories. The book received the American Book Award decades later in 1992. Thompson was born in the Klamath River village of Pecwan.  Outside the book she is known to have come from "Yurok aristocracy" and to be married to a caucasian man named Milton "Jim" Thompson. She intended to tell the stories of her people that were not being told by others, and to make others better understand her people and perspective, although she also criticized whites for practices like overfishing.  Thompson expressed that violence towards indigenous Californians were deliberate acts of genocide and she expressed concern for the continued stewardship of Klamath River salmon.

Life 

Born October 29, 1856 in Pec-Wan Village, Lucy Thompson was a member of the Yurok Tribe, located in Norther California.  Her Yurok name was Che-na-wah Weitch-ah-wah. Weitch-ah-wah's was trained as a Talth, or spiritual leader, by her father, who also served the tribe in this capacity. in 1875, she married Jim Thompson, a white timber cruiser who was also an important figure in the local Masonic Lodge. Together they lived along the Klamath River and moved to Eureka in 1910.  Lucy died in Eureka, California on February 23, 1932, only a year and two months after her husbands passing.

Awards 
Thompson received the American Book Award for her book To the American Indian: Reminiscences of a Yurok Woman.

Works 
Lucy Thompson's major work is her nonfiction, biographical book To the American Indian: Reminiscences of a Yurok Woman, originally published in 1916. The book explores Thompson's own life and upbringing, as well as other members of the Yurok tribe, in late nineteenth and early twentieth century California.

References

Bibliography
 Buckley, Thomas. (1993). Lucy Thompson: To the American Indian, Reminiscences of a Yurok Woman (Book Review). Ethnohistory, 40(3), 482.
 Pilling, Arnold R. "Lucy Thompson: To the American Indian: Reminiscences of a Yurok Woman" (Book review). Journal of California and Great Basin Anthropology, 14(2), 7 Jan. 1992.
 McClure, Elizabeth. (2020). Light is the normal course of events, darkness is only a temporary interruption. Humboldt Journal of Social Relations, (42), 106-115.

External links 
 

1856 births
1932 deaths
Native American writers
Yurok
Yurok people
American Book Award winners
20th-century Native Americans
19th-century Native Americans
19th-century Native American women
20th-century Native American women